Andreas Bang-Haas (6 December 1846 – 7 February 1925) was a Danish entomologist and insect dealer.

Bang-Haas was born in Horsens.  In 1879 he entered into the business of the insect dealer Otto Staudinger. He married Staudinger's daughter in 1880 and became co-owner of the firm, now "Staudinger & Bang-Haas", in 1884 or 1887.  He died in Dresden, aged 78.  The business was eventually taken over by his son Otto Bang-Haas.

References
Hedicke, H. 1925: [Bang-Haas, A.]  Dtsch. ent. Ztschr. 1925 87-88 
Pfaff, G. & Wrede, O. H. 1934: [Bang-Haas, A.] Festschrift, 50jähriges Bestehen I.E.V. 7, Portr. 
Seitz, A. 1925: [Bang-Haas, A.]  Ent. Rundschau 42 9

Danish lepidopterists
1846 births
1925 deaths
People from Horsens